The 2020 Porsche Sprint Challenge Great Britain (known for sponsorship reasons as the 2020 Cayman Islands Porsche Sprint Challenge Great Britain) was a multi-event, one-make motor racing championship held across England and Scotland. The championship featured a mix of professional motor racing teams and privately funded drivers, competing in Porsche 718 Cayman GT4 Clubsport cars. The 2020 season was the 1st Porsche Sprint Challenge GB season, the season began on 11 July 2020 at Snetterton Circuit and ended on 8 November at Silverstone Circuit.

Teams and Drivers
The following teams and drivers are currently signed to run the 2020 season.
{|
|

Race Calendar
A new calendar was announced on 26 May 2020.

Championship standings

Drivers' championships

Overall championship

* Guest entry - not eligible for points

Notes

References

External links
 Porsche Sprint Challenge GB News

Porsche Sprint Challenge GB
Porsche in motorsport